The 1886 United States House of Representatives elections in South Carolina were held on November 2, 1886 to select seven Representatives for one two-year terms from the state of South Carolina.  Five incumbents were re-elected, the Republican incumbent was defeated, and the open seat was retained by the Democrats.  The composition of the state delegation after the election was solely Democratic.

1st congressional district
Incumbent Democratic Congressman Samuel Dibble of the 1st congressional district, in office since 1883, was unopposed in his bid for re-election.

General election results

|-
| 
| colspan=5 |Democratic hold
|-

2nd congressional district
Incumbent Democratic Congressman George D. Tillman of the 2nd congressional district, in office since 1883, was unopposed in his bid for re-election.

General election results

|-
| 
| colspan=5 |Democratic hold
|-

3rd congressional district
Incumbent Democratic Congressman D. Wyatt Aiken of the 3rd congressional district, in office since 1877, opted to retire.  James S. Cothran was nominated by the Democrats and was unopposed in his bid for election.

General election results

|-
| 
| colspan=5 |Democratic hold
|-

4th congressional district
Incumbent Democratic Congressman William H. Perry of the 4th congressional district, in office since 1885, was unopposed in his bid for re-election.

General election results

|-
| 
| colspan=5 |Democratic hold
|-

5th congressional district
Incumbent Democratic Congressman John J. Hemphill of the 5th congressional district, in office since 1883, won the Democratic primary and was unopposed in the general election.

Democratic primary

General election results

|-
| 
| colspan=5 |Democratic hold
|-

6th congressional district
Incumbent Democratic Congressman George W. Dargan of the 6th congressional district, in office since 1883, was unopposed in his bid for re-election.

General election results

|-
| 
| colspan=5 |Democratic hold
|-

7th congressional district
Incumbent Republican Congressman Robert Smalls of the 7th congressional district, in office since 1884, was defeated by Democratic challenger William Elliott.

General election results

|-
| 
| colspan=5 |Democratic gain from Republican
|-

See also
United States House of Representatives elections, 1886
South Carolina gubernatorial election, 1886
South Carolina's congressional districts

References

South Carolina
1886
1886 South Carolina elections